El Ranco Province is one of two provinces of the southern Chilean region of Los Ríos. It is named after Ranco Lake shared by the communes (comunas) of Futrono and Lago Ranco. The lake is drained by the Bueno River, on which basin lies most of the province. La Unión is the provincial capital.

Administration
As a second-level administrative division, the province comprises four communes, each with its own governing municipality. Alsono Pérez de Arce Carrasco is the provincial governor.

Communes
Futrono
Lago Ranco
La Unión
Río Bueno

Geography and demography
Of these, 51,273 (52.8%) lived in urban areas and 45,880 (47.2%) in rural areas. Between the 1992 and 2002 censuses, the population grew by 1% (924 persons).

References

Provinces of Chile
Provinces of Los Ríos Region
2007 in Chilean law